Martin Slivka (1 November 1929 in Spišský Štiavnik – 23 September 2002 in Bratislava) was a Slovak documentary filmmaker, director, screenwriter, and ethnographer. He is best remembered for his documentaries Metamorfóza vlákna (1968), Človek a hra (1968), Deti a hudba (1969), Fašiangy (1969), and Ľudová kultúra na Slovensku (1972).

References 

1929 births
2002 deaths
Slovak documentary filmmakers
Slovak directors
Slovak screenwriters
Male screenwriters
Ethnographers
Documentary film directors